Sanganois State Fish and Wildlife Area is an Illinois state park on  in Cass, Schuyler, and Mason County, Illinois, United States.

References

State parks of Illinois
Protected areas of Cass County, Illinois
Protected areas of Mason County, Illinois
Protected areas of Schuyler County, Illinois
Protected areas established in 1948
1948 establishments in Illinois